Paul Caffyn  is a sea kayaker based in Runanga on the West Coast of New Zealand. He has completed a number of supported, unsupported, solo and group expeditions by sea kayak in various locations around the world. He has been described as follows by John Dowd:
    

Caffyn was appointed an Officer of the New Zealand Order of Merit in the 2012 New Year Honours, for services to sea kayaking and water safety.

Expeditions 

1978 Circumnavigation of the South Island, New Zealand
The expedition around the South Island started as an expedition along the Fiordland coast with fellow paddler Max Reynolds. Caffyn continued solo and with ground support to complete the circumnavigation in 76 days.{ source: Obscured by waves}

1978/79 Circumnavigation of the North Island, New Zealand
Caffyn sea kayaked solo around the North Island, with ground party support. The circumnavigation took 86 days, after which Caffyn undertook a crossing of Cook Strait by sea kayak.{source: Cresting the Restless Wave}

1979 Circumnavigation of Stewart Island, New Zealand
The expedition around Stewart Island was done with Max Reynolds, August and September 1979. This expedition departed from Bluff, New Zealand starting with a crossing of Foveaux Strait. { source: Dark Side of the Wave}

1980 Circumnavigation of Great Britain
Caffyn and Nigel Dennis circumnavigated Great Britain by sea kayak in 85 days.

1981/82 Circumnavigation of Australia
1985 solo circumnavigation of the four main islands of Japan
1991 completed the first solo sea kayak trip along the entire coastline of Alaska
1997 Circumnavigation of New Caledonia
Two attempts to cross the Tasman Sea by sea kayak
2001/2002 Circumnavigation of Phuket

Bibliography 

Caffyn has written a number of books about his expeditions:

The Dreamtime Voyage around Australia Kayak Odyssey 
Cresting the Restless Wave, North Island Kayak Odyssey 
Dark Side of the Wave, Stewart Island Kayak Odyssey. 
Obscured by Waves, South Island Canoe Odyssey. 
The Dreamtime Voyage around Australia Kayak Odyssey (25th anniversary edition) 
The Search for the Deepest Hole in the World (January 2021) by Paul Caffyn and Van Watson , Kayak Dundee Press

References

External links 
 Paul Caffyn's website
 Coastbusters New Zealand, Paul Caffyns short biography
 Article Paddler Magazine
 Article regarding Paul Caffyn
 Paul Caffyn's The Dreamtime Voyage 25th Anniversary Edition

Living people
Kayakers
Officers of the New Zealand Order of Merit
Year of birth missing (living people)